Central Park Historic District may refer to:

in the United States
(by state then city)
 Central Park Historic District (West Palm Beach, Florida), listed on the NRHP in Florida
Central Park-North Main Street Historic District, Charles City, Iowa, listed on the NRHP in Iowa
 Central Park Historic District (Hannibal, Missouri), listed on the NRHP in Missouri
Central Park, New York, NY, listed as a historic district on the NRHP in New York City
Central Park West Historic District, New York, NY, listed on the NRHP in New York City 
 Central Park Historic District (Two Rivers, Wisconsin), listed on the NRHP in Wisconsin